This is a list of United States Cabinet members who have served for more than two presidential terms.

More than eight years in a single cabinet office

More than eight years over multiple cabinet offices

Near Misses & Technicalities 
Several individuals have come close to this distinction; only having have missed it by months, weeks, or days. Listed below are the names of individuals who came within a year of the achievement.

 William L. Marcy missed this distinction by 2 days, having served under President James K. Polk as Secretary of War (1845-1849), and under Presidents Franklin Pierce and James Buchanan as their Secretary of State (1853-1857). Marcy served for 2921 days over these 3 administrations, just under the threshold of 2922 days.
 David F. Houston missed this distinction by 3 days, having served under President Woodrow Wilson as Secretary of Agriculture (1913-1920) and then as Secretary of the Treasury (1920-2921). Houston served for 2920 days, which is exactly 8 regular years (not accounting for leap days), leaving him just short of 2922 day threshold. 
 William P. Rogers served for 2872 days in a cabinet office, 51 days short. Rogers served first under President Dwight Eisenhower as Attorney General (1957-1961) and then later under Richard Nixon as Secretary of State. Rogers earlier served in the sub-cabinet as Deputy Attorney General (1953-1957), and as a result served at a cabinet or sub-cabinet level during all 2922 days of the Eisenhower Administration.
 Richard Rush served for 2832 days in a cabinet office, 91 days short. Rush first served under James Madison and then James Monroe as their Attorney General (1814-1817). Rush also simultaneously served as acting Secretary of State for a short period under Monroe. Rush later returned to the cabinet under John Quincy Adams as his Secretary of the Treasury (1825-1829).

Notes

References

+